Miranda (also known as The Mistress of the Inn) is a 1985 Italian erotic drama film directed by Tinto Brass. It is loosely based on the three-act comedy La locandiera by  Carlo Goldoni.

Plot
Miranda (Serena Grandi) is an innkeeper living in a small Po Valley town of the late 1940s. She is left a widow after her husband is lost in World War II but she has been denying marriage, waiting (at least verbally) for her husband's return. Her lover is the transporter Berto (Andrea Occhipinti), but while Berto is away, she also runs affairs with other men, namely Carlo (Franco Interlenghi), an older and rich former fascist who buys expensive presents to Miranda and Norman (Andy J. Forest), an American engineer who works in the environs of the town. Meanwhile, Tony (Franco Branciaroli), an employee at the inn also has a deep interest in Miranda but she always insists on keeping him at bay.

Cast
 Serena Grandi 	
 Andrea Occhipinti 	
 Franco Interlenghi 	
 Andy J. Forest 
 Franco Branciaroli 	
 Malisa Longo		
 Laura Sassi 	
 Isabelle Illiers	
 Luciana Cirenei 		
 Jean René Lemoine	
 Mauro Paladini
 Enzo Turrin

Production
Director Tinto Brass asked the aspirants for the role of Miranda to strip completely naked in front of him during the audition. "I had to try a film scene, with the camera filming every part of my body," recalled Serena Grandi who was the chosen one.

References

External links

1985 films
Films directed by Tinto Brass
Italian erotic drama films
Films set in 1949
Films scored by Riz Ortolani
Adaptations of works by Carlo Goldoni
1980s erotic drama films
1980s Italian-language films
1980s Italian films